Astrolabe Subglacial Basin is a subglacial basin to the south of the Adélie Coast and east of Porpoise Subglacial Highlands, trending north–south and containing the thickest ice — about  — measured in Antarctica. The basin was delineated by the SPRI-NSF-TUD airborne radio echo sounding program, 1967–79, and named after the Astrolabe, the flagship of the French Antarctic Expedition, 1837–40, under Captain Jules Dumont d'Urville.

References
 

Structural basins of Antarctica
Landforms of Adélie Land